Peter Marti (born 12 July 1952 in Langenthal) is a Swiss former footballer who played as a striker during the 1970s and 1980s.

Marti began his career at BSC Young Boys in 1970 before signing for FC Zürich in 1972. In the 1973 Cupfinal Marti scored the first goal as Zürich beat Basel 2:0 aet.

In 1975, Marti transferred to Helmut Benthaus' successful FC Basel where he played for six years and won two national championships. He played for FC Aarau in the 1981/82 season and again for Basel during the 1982/83 season. In 1983 Marti signed for Aarau and retired in 1985.

Peter Marti played six games for the Swiss national football team.

Honours
Zürich
 Swiss Cup winner: 1973

Basel
 Swiss League Champion: 1977, 1980
 Uhrencup Winner: 1978, 1979, 1980

References

External links

 

1952 births
Living people
Swiss men's footballers
Switzerland international footballers
Association football forwards
BSC Young Boys players
FC Zürich players
FC Basel players
FC Aarau players
People from Langenthal
Sportspeople from the canton of Bern